Rustam Ramizovich Khudiyev (Rustam Ramizovich Hudiev; born 6 January 1985 in Pavlodar, Kazakh SSR, USSR) is an Olympic butterfly swimmer from Kazakhstan. He swam for Kazakhstan at the 2004 and 2008 Olympics.

His best result was finishing in 41st place in the men's 100m butterfly event in at the 2004 Games.

He also swam for Kazakhstan at the 2007 World Championships.

References

1985 births
Living people
Kazakhstani male butterfly swimmers
Swimmers at the 2004 Summer Olympics
Swimmers at the 2008 Summer Olympics
Olympic swimmers of Kazakhstan
People from Pavlodar
Asian Games medalists in swimming
Swimmers at the 2006 Asian Games
Swimmers at the 2010 Asian Games
Medalists at the 2010 Asian Games
Asian Games bronze medalists for Kazakhstan
21st-century Kazakhstani people